The First Battle of Artois (17 December 1914 – 13 January 1915) was a battle fought during World War I by the French and German armies on the Western Front. The battle was the first offensive move on the Western Front by either side after the end of the First Battle of Ypres in November 1914. The French assault failed to break the stalemate.

Background
During what became known as the Race to the Sea the Battle of Arras  had been fought, after which local operations, particularly on the Lorette Spur, continued during the First Battle of Flanders to the north.

Subsequent operations

In May 1915, the Tenth Army conducted an offensive known as the Second Battle of Artois.

Footnotes

References

Books

Further reading
 
 
 

encyclopedias

External links

Battles of the Western Front (World War I)
Conflicts in 1914
Conflicts in 1915
History of the Pas-de-Calais
Battles of World War I involving France
Battles of World War I involving Germany
Battles of World War I involving the United Kingdom
1914 in France
1915 in France
December 1914 events
January 1915 events